The Tejeros Convention, also known as the Tejeros Assembly and the Tejeros Congress, was a meeting held on March 22, 1897, between Katipunan factions of Magdiwang and Magdalo in San Francisco de Malabon, Cavite (now General Trias) that resulted in the creation of a new revolutionary government that took charge of the Philippine Revolution, replacing the Katipunan. It followed on a previous meeting now known as the Imus Assembly.  Filipino historians consider the first presidential and vice presidential elections in Philippine history to have been held at this convention, although only Katipuneros (members of the Katipunan) were able to take part, and not the general populace.

Convention

Purpose

The revolutionary leaders called the convention in a friar estate residence in Tejeros, ostensibly to discuss the defense of Cavite against the Spaniards during the Philippine Revolution (the contemporary Governor General, Camilo de Polavieja, had regained much of Cavite itself). Instead of focusing on the defense of the province, the convention became an election to decide the leaders of the revolutionary movement, to settle once and for all the issue of governance within the Katipunan and of the revolutionary effort - the cause of the escalating tension between the Magdalo and Magdiwang forces of Cavite, and bypassing the existing Supreme Council of the Katipunan, as represented by Andrés Bonifacio, its "Supreme President" (Kataastaasang Pangulo, Presidente Supremo - often shortened by others to just Supremo, but despite popular belief, generally not by Bonifacio himself; he instead used Pangulo or the fuller terms) who had been invited to Cavite months earlier to mediate and had taken the side of the Magdiwang. While Bonifacio and his allies within Magdiwang maintained that the Katipunan was already sufficient as their government, the Magdalo people and their own sympathizers within Magdiwang maintained the need to establish a new government. 

Amidst questioning on whether the Katipunan, which already operated as an alternative revolutionary government, was more like a democracy or a monarchy, Bonifacio defended that it was republican and democratic in nature. According to him, they were all united against the King of Spain to have their own free and sovereign government, and that all Katipunan members of any given rank were meant to serve under the principles of liberty, equality, and fraternity, upon which republicanism was founded, and that their government stood for the sovereignty of the people, not only of one or two persons.

Most of the day was spent in debates, and a tumult broke out after the Magdalo side called the status quo of the revolutionaries no better than that of bandits or wild animals, which the Magdiwang on Bonifacio's side took offense to. After order was restored, some pushed for the convention to be adjourned, but Bonifacio prevailed upon them to continue. Jacinto Lumbreras of Magdiwang, who had served as chairman of the assembly and presided over the proceedings to that point, then refused to continue as chairman, since if they were to discuss replacing the Katipunan, then Bonifacio should preside as the "father of the Katipunan and the Revolution". Bonifacio was thus made chairman. Despite his concern about the lack of officials and representatives from other provinces and other Katipunan councils, he bowed to the will of the majority and was obliged to proceed with the elections.

Election results
Bonifacio presided over the election as chairman of the convention. He secured the unanimous approval of the assembly that the decisions would not be questioned, and the winners be respected regardless of their stations in life or educational attainment.

The results of the election:

After Aguinaldo was elected president, Severino de las Alas of Magdiwang proposed that Bonifacio automatically be considered vice president since he had received the second highest number of votes. Nobody seconded or contested the motion, so Bonifacio as chairman ruled that the elections should continue. Mariano Trias of Magdiwang was then elected vice president over Mariano Alvarez, the president of Magdiwang, and Bonifacio. Artemio Ricarte of Magdiwang was then elected Captain-General over Santiago Alvarez (son of Mariano), also of Magdiwang. Ricarte, aka "General Vibora", tried to demur and concede to Alvarez aka "General Apoy", but Alvarez himself insisted that he accept it and vouched for him. Then Baldomero Aguinaldo, cousin of Emilio and president of Magdalo, suggested that people stand in groups to make the voting faster so they could finish before it got too dark. This was followed, and Emiliano Riego de Dios of Magdiwang was elected Director of War over Santiago Alvarez and Ariston Villanueva of Magdiwang and Daniel Tirona of Magdalo. Finally, Bonifacio was elected Director of the Interior over Mariano Alvarez.  

However, after Bonifacio was elected, Daniel Tirona loudly objected that the post should not be occupied by a person without a lawyer's diploma. He instead nominated a lawyer, Jose del Rosario (of Magdiwang), as qualified for the suitable position. Bonifacio was greatly embarrassed, and demanded that Tirona retract the remark and apologize to the assembly. When Tirona made to leave instead, Bonifacio drew a pistol and was about to fire at Tirona, but stopped when Ricarte tried to disarm him. Bonifacio then invoked his role as the chairman of the assembly and the supreme president of the Katipunan and declared all proceedings that day to be null and void, and left with his supporters.

Allegations of fraud

In addition to Bonifacio's statement voiding the outcome, the probity of the election held was questioned, with allegations that many ballots distributed were already filled out and that the voters had not done this themselves.

In their memoirs, Santiago Álvarez and Gregoria de Jesús both alleged that many ballots were already filled out before being distributed, and Guillermo Masangkay contended there were more ballots prepared than voters present. Álvarez writes that Bonifacio had been warned by a Cavite leader Diego Mojica of the rigged ballots before the votes were canvassed, but he had done nothing.

Post-convention events

Emilio Aguinaldo was not present at the convention, but was at a military front at Pasong Santol, a barrio of Dasmariñas, Cavite. He was notified of his election  to the Presidency the following day, and his elder brother, Crispulo Aguinaldo, persuaded him to travel to take the oath of office. Leaving Crispulo in command, Aguinaldo traveled to Santa Cruz de Malabon (now Tanza, Cavite), where he and the others elected, with the exception of Bonifacio, took their oath of office. Crispulo Aguinaldo was among those killed in the Battle of Pasong Santol between March 7 and 24, 1897, which ended with a Spanish victory. Aguinaldo surreptitiously took his oath of office as president in a chapel officiated by a Catholic priest Cenon Villafranca who was under the authority of the Roman pope. According to Gen. Santiago Alvarez, guards were posted outside with strict instructions not to let in any unwanted partisan from the Magdiwang faction while the oath-taking took place. Artemio Ricarte also took his office "with great reluctance" and made a declaration that he found the Tejeros elections "dirty or shady" and "not been in conformity with the true will of the people." 

After leaving the convention, Bonifacio met on March 28 with 45 of his followers. Convinced that the election at the convention had been invalid, they drew up a document titled Acta de Tejeros giving their reasons for having rejected the convention results. They then proceeded to Naik and drew up another document on April 19, sometimes referred to as the Naic Military Agreement, repudiating the insurgent government established at Tejeros. 

Aguinaldo did not at first fully or openly assume the office of president, though he had secretly taken the oath of office, and first managed to secure support among Magdalo and Magdiwang alike. He sent a delegation to contact the increasingly isolated Bonifacio and persuade him to cooperate. The delegation was able to contact Bonifacio, but was unable to persuade him as he resolved to move out of the province. Some Magdiwang leaders, led by Pio del Pilar and Mariano Alvarez, eventually recanted their previous insistence that the result of the Tejeros convention was null and void, thereby recognizing the validity of the elected leaders there, and some others later occupying the five vacant positions upon appointment from Aguinaldo.  The newly appointed officials took their oath of office on April 24, 1897, when Aguinaldo fully and openly assumed the office of president. On the same day, he convened the first session of the cabinet and issued an official circular informing the town presidents of all municipalities that he was duly elected by the convention and was assuming his position as president. 

Several complaints against Bonifacio, notably from Severino de las Alas and Jose Coronel, were then presented to Aguinaldo. He then ordered Bonifacio's arrest before he could leave Cavite, and dispatched a force to Bonifacio's camp at Limbon, Indang. The unsuspecting Bonifacio received them cordially on the 25th, but was arrested along with his brother Procopio early the next day. In the resulting exchange of gunfire and scuffles, despite Bonifacio ordering his men not to fight and not putting up resistance himself, he was wounded and his other sibling, Ciriaco, was killed. Andres and Procopio Bonifacio were tried on charges of treason by members of the war council of Aguinaldo's government. On May 10, 1897, the brothers were executed.

Finalized government
 

The finalized revolutionary government lasted from April 24, 1897, to November 1 of the same year, when it was replaced by the "Republic of the Philippines" (Republica de Filipinas), commonly known today as the "Republic of Biak-na-Bato", which was led by some of the same people including Aguinaldo as president. During its tenure, the whole of Cavite fell under Spanish control again and Aguinaldo retreated to Bulacan.

While today Aguinaldo is considered by the Philippine government and conventional Philippine historiography to be the first President of the Philippines, this is not based on his office established at Tejeros but upon his being the president of the later "First Philippine Republic" or "Malolos Republic" in 1899. 

Unlike the aforementioned later governments, Filipino historians do not have a standardized name for the earliest revolutionary government headed by Aguinaldo, the Tejeros government. During the elections, the name Republica Filipina (Philippine Republic, also the formal name of the "First Republic" of 1899) was mentioned. After Aguinaldo had secured his position among the Magdalo and Magdiwang alike, it was proclaimed and named in documents as Republica de Filipinas (Republic of the Philippines, akin to the official name of the present-day Philippine government). During Bonifacio's trial, the court referred to their government as the Pamahalaan ng Sangkatagalugan (roughly "Government of all Tagalogs" or "Government of the [whole] Tagalog Nation/People"). This last term is akin to the earlier terms Haring Bayang Katagalugan or Republika ng Katagalugan ("Sovereign Tagalog Nation/People" or "Republic of the Tagalog Nation/People", called in Spanish sources Republica Tagala) which describes Bonifacio's concept of a Philippine nation and revolutionary government spanning the entire archipelago, with "Tagalog" serving as a synonym/replacement for "Filipino", as realized through the Katipunan with him as president ("Pangulo ng Haring Bayan"), and predating but superseded by Tejeros.

References

Bibliography

 The Tejeros Assembly of 1897 MSC Computer Training Center
 Katipunan and the Acto de Tejeros, March 23, 1897, Documents of the Katipunan, Katipunan : Documents and studies
 
 
 

1897 elections in the Philippines
History of Cavite
Political party leadership elections
Philippine Revolution
Presidential elections in the Philippines
March 1897 events
1897 conferences